Tahiru Awudu (born 10 March 2000) is a Ghanaian footballer who plays for Spanish club CD Badajoz on loan from Medeama SC as a forward.

Club career
Born in Accra, Awudu joined Medeama SC ahead of the 2018 season from lower side Konogo Shooting Stars. He made his first team debut on 25 March 2018, playing the last five minutes of a 2–0 away loss against Bechem United FC.

Awudu scored his first professional goal on 3 May 2018, netting the equalizer in a 1–1 draw at Ebusua Dwarfs FC. On 13 August 2019, he renewed his contract with the club until 2023.

On 13 January 2020, Awudu moved abroad and agreed to a loan deal with Spanish Tercera División side Fútbol Alcobendas Sport until the end of the season. On 12 September, after a trial period, he joined CF Fuenlabrada also in a temporary deal, and was initially assigned to the reserves in the regional leagues.

Awudu made his first team debut for Fuenla on 13 September 2020, starting and scoring the opener in a 2–0 Segunda División home win against CD Lugo. The following 1 February, after being sparingly used, he cut short his loan and moved to Segunda División B side CD Badajoz.

References

External links

2000 births
Living people
Footballers from Accra
Ghanaian footballers
Association football forwards
Ghana Premier League players
Medeama SC players
Segunda División players
Primera Federación players
Tercera División players
CD Paracuellos Antamira players
CF Fuenlabrada footballers
CD Badajoz players
Ghanaian expatriate footballers
Ghanaian expatriate sportspeople in Spain
Expatriate footballers in Spain